Prionosciadium watsonii is a plant species known from the Mexican states of Durango and Sinaloa.

Prionosciadium watsonii is a biennial herb with a large taproot. Leaves are compound with narrowly lanceolate, some of the leaflets with narrowly lanceolate lobes. Flowers are borne in umbels on the tips of branches.

References

Apioideae
Endemic flora of Mexico
Flora of Durango
Flora of Sinaloa
Taxa named by John Merle Coulter